Rose Shahfa was a Lebanese writer and women's rights activist.

Shahfa joined the Syrian-Lebanese Women's Union in the 1920s as one of many women promoting the role of women in society. After women's journals began to decline in the 1930s, Shahfa continued to work in women's journalism as a prominent writer for several journals. This change limited her ability to write freely about women's topics to the same extent as previous women's writers. When writing for the fascist journal al-Amali, she described motherhood as a prominent role in the lives of women and a means through which women could increase their influence in society. In November 1943, Shahfa was one of the leaders of protests against the paternalist Kataeb Party.

On 11 December 1944, Shahfa led the Lebanese delegation to the first Arab Women's Conference. At this conference, she argued strongly in favor of women's participation in politics, arguing "that the educated woman has more right to political privileges than the ignorant man who enjoys these rights". In particular, she supported women's involvement in the peace process of World War II.  Shahfa lobbied Lebanese Prime Minister Abdul Hamid Karami to accept the resolutions proposed at the conference, convincing him to organize a committee to address the issue.

References

Sources 

 
 
 

Lebanese suffragists
Lebanese women's rights activists
19th-century Lebanese writers
19th-century women writers
20th-century Lebanese women writers
20th-century Lebanese writers
20th-century women writers
Year of birth missing
Year of death missing